The Pinsent Baronetcy, of Selly Hill in the City of Birmingham, is a title in the Baronetage of the United Kingdom. It was created on 3 February 1938 for Richard Pinsent, President of the Law Society from 1918 to 1919 and founding partner of Pinsent & Co, a predecessor firm of Pinsent Masons. Rower and Olympic gold medallist Sir Matthew Pinsent is the grandson of Clive Pinsent, younger son of the first Baronet.

Pinsent baronets, of Selly Hill (1938)
Sir Richard Alfred Pinsent, 1st Baronet (1852–1948)
Sir Roy Pinsent, 2nd Baronet (1883–1978)
Sir Christopher Roy Pinsent, 3rd Baronet (1922–2015)
Sir Thomas Benjamin Roy Pinsent, 4th Baronet (born 1967)

The heir presumptive is the current holder's cousin, William Ross Pinsent (born 1955), grandson of the second baronet.

See also
Pynsent baronets

References

Kidd, Charles, Williamson, David (editors). Debrett's Peerage and Baronetage (1990 edition). New York: St Martin's Press, 1990.

Pinsent